Model Shop may refer to:

Model Shop (film), a 1969 Jacques Demy film
Model Shop (album), the soundtrack to the film, recorded by Spirit